Ulaanbaatar is the main railway station of Ulaanbaatar, the capital of Mongolia.

The station is the center of regional and international traffic in Mongolia, and is the largest station in the country. The Trans-Mongolian Railway passes through the station.

History
The station was opened in 1949. In 2014 it became the main terminal of the Ulaanbaatar Railbus.

Trains

Media

References

External links
 Official website of Mongolian Railway

Railway stations in Mongolia
Train station
Articles containing video clips
1949 establishments in Mongolia
Transport in Ulaanbaatar